MED or med may refer to:

Healthcare
 Medical extrication device, a device for extricating an injured patient from an accident site, such as the Kendrick extrication device
 Medication, often used in the plural "meds"
 Medicine (or medical)
 Minimal erythemal dose, the minimum dose of radiation that produces skin erythema
 Multiple epiphyseal dysplasia, a rare genetic disorder
 Title of Medic, the first Physician degree in Argentina
 Minimum effective dose

Places
 MED, the IATA code for Prince Mohammad bin Abdulaziz Airport in Medina, Saudi Arabia
 Mediterranean Sea

People
 M.E.D. (rapper), American Hip hop artist signed to Stones Throw Records
 Michael Eric Dyson (born 1958), American academic, author, and radio host

Technology
 .med filename extension, used for:
 tracker modules created by OctaMED
 MEDLINE documents
 backup files created by WordPerfect's macro editor
 Manhattan Engineer District, US project to develop a nuclear bomb during World War II (colloquially known as the Manhattan Project)
 Media Endpoint Discovery, an enhancement of the Ethernet data communications Link Layer Discovery Protocol 
 Multi-Exit Discriminator, a network traffic routing protocol in the Border Gateway Protocol 
 Multiple-effect distillation
 Music EDitor, by Tejio Kinnunen, predecessor of OctaMED
 UTA MED, a type of diesel multiple unit railcar of Northern Ireland Railways
 MEd – design bending moment according to Eurocodes

Other
 Macmillan English Dictionary, by Macmillan Publishers
 Marine Equipment Directive 96/98/EC (M.E.D. 96/98/EC), an authorization by the European Union of equipment and products for the marine industry
 Master of Education (M.Ed.), a postgraduate academic degree
 Ministry of Economic Development (New Zealand)
 Minister of Entrepreneur Development (Malaysia)
 Mediocalcar, a genus of orchids
 Ukrainian word for honey

See also

 
 
 Meda (disambiguation)
 Mede (disambiguation)
 Medi
 Medic (disambiguation)
 Medo (disambiguation)
 Medus